The National (or State) Theatre of Northern Greece (Κρατικό Θέατρο Βορείου Ελλάδος), an institution promoting theatrical plays in Thessaloniki and northern Greece, was founded in 1961 by Sokratis Karantinos, its first director. The Drama School and the Dance Theatre are integral parts of the National Theatre.

The first base of the institution was the building of the Royal Theatre (Thessaloniki) but in 1962 was transferred to the current building.

The complex of the Society of Macedonian Studies consists of three buildings. Megaron B', which hosts the theatre, was designed in early 1950s by Vasilis Kassandras, influenced by the Théâtre des Champs-Élysées.

NTNG’s present institutional framework was established in 1994, with an Artistic Director and a seven-member Board of Directors who run the Theatre, which is subsidized by the Ministry of Culture and Tourism (Greece). With four indoor theatres and two open-air theatres, NTNG is one of the biggest theatre organizations in Greece and Europe.

Since May 1996, NTNG has been a member of the Union of the Theatres of Europe (https://www.union-theatres-europe.eu). In October 1997, the 6th Festival of the Union of the Theatres of Europe took place in Thessaloniki, and was a great cultural event for Thessaloniki as well as for Greece. NTNG is also a member of the International Theatre Institute and the Greek Theatre Centre for children and young people.

Activities 

Its activity is not limited to theatrical productions but extends to cultural sectors such as education, literature and the arts through the organization of exhibitions, conferences, festivals, theatre-educational programmes and so forth. NTNG’s annual artistic programme combines in-house productions (including Dance Theatre), co-productions with other theatres, tributes and exchanges with important theatre organizations, as well as guest performances from Greece and abroad.

In an effort to reach children and young people, NTNG promotes the activities of the Children’s Stage, which presents performances for schools and educational organizations, as well as educational programmes familiarizing pupils with the world and the art of theatre. In the last few years, NTNG has greatly developed its theatrical research and publishing activities.

The Literary and Publications Departments provide theoretical support on specific fields related to the production while researchers and academics are able to access the theatre’s fully documented archive visiting its Digital Library or its dynamic website.

In the ambit of the European Programme ‘Culture’, NTNG implemented a series of important projects (Among others, hosting of the events of the 11th and 12th Europe Theatre Prize).

References

Theatres in Thessaloniki
Art Deco architecture in Greece
1961 establishments in Greece